The SS Annie Oakley (Hull Number 2227) was a Liberty ship built in the United States during World War II. She was named after Annie Oakley, an American sharpshooter from the American West.

The ship was laid down on 21 August 1943, then launched on 12 September 1943.  She was lost after she was torpedoed by a German submarine in the English Channel in 1945.

References

Liberty ships
Ships sunk by German submarines in World War II
World War II shipwrecks in the English Channel
Maritime incidents in April 1945